Karasuwa is a Local Government Area in Yobe State, Nigeria.

It has an area of 1,162 km2 and a population of 106,992 at the 2006 census.

Land Areas

Karasuwa local government area consists of larger towns which include: Jajimaji, Bukarti, Kasuwa Sidi, and small villages such as Tsamiyan Gada, etc.

The postal code of the area is 630.

Cultures and Tribes

Basically the people predominantly live in Karasuwa, which is 70 percent Manga tribe, which  originated from sub Kanuri tribe. Most residents are farmers, both in towns and villages.

The Bade language is spoken in Karasuwa LGA.

See also 
 List of Local Government Areas in Yobe State

References

Local Government Areas in Yobe State